The Wang clan of Taiyuan was a Chinese clan which achieved prominence between the Han and Tang dynasties, based in Taiyuan in modern-day Shanxi province.

The earliest prominent members of this clan can be traced back to two brothers, Wang Rou and Wang Ze, of the Eastern Han Dynasty.

History

Northern and Southern Dynasties

The Wang clan generally did not move southwards after the Disaster of Yongjia and the fall of the Western Jin.

During the Northern Wei period, the Wang clan was considered one of the 'four surnames' - four powerful clans, alongside the Lu clan of Fanyang, the Cui clan of Qinghe and the Zheng clan of Xingyang.

Prominent Members

 Wang Chang (d. 259), Cao Wei official and commander
 Wang Hun (223-297), son of Wang Chang, Cao Wei and Jin minister
 Wang Chen (d. 266), Cao Wei and Jin minister and historian
 Wang Jun (252-314), son of Wang Chen, Jin commander and warlord
 Wang Tanzhi (330-375), Jin minister
 Wang Pu (d. 905), Tang dynasty chancellor

See also

 Wang clan of Langya, another prominent clan surnamed Wang

References

Chinese clans